SP-55 is a highway in the eastern and the southeastern parts of the state of São Paulo in Brazil.  The highway runs from the city of the Ubatuba up to Pedro de Toledo (BR-116)

The highway is split into four sections:

Rodovia Manuel Hipólito Rego, Doutor - from - to: Ubatuba - Bertioga
Unnamed section from - to: Bertioga - SP-248/055 (Monte Cabrão)
Domenico Rangoni, Cônego - from - to: SP-248/055 (Monte Cabrão) - Cubatão
Rodovia Padre Manuel da Nóbrega from - to Cubatão - Itanhaém - Peruíbe - Pedro de Toledo (BR-116)

References 

Highways in São Paulo (state)